The initialism CHI may refer to:

Health
Catholic Health Initiatives, a hospital network in the United States 
Child Health International, UK-based charity
Commission for Health Improvement, former UK body
Community Health Index, Scotland
Comprehensive health insurance
Creatinine height ratio, estimating protein in body composition

Places & Sports Teams
 An abbreviation for the U.S. city of Chicago, Illinois and its major professional sports teams 
 Chicago Bears of the National Football League
 Chicago Blackhawks of the National Hockey League
 Chicago Bulls of the National Basketball Association
 Chicago Cubs, also CHC, of Major League Baseball
 Chicago Fire of Major League Soccer
 Chicago White Sox, also CWS, of Major League Baseball
 Chile (in sports: IOC and FIFA code CHI)
 Channel Islands, a UK dependency (Chapman code: CHI)

Science and technology
Carvill Hurricane Index
Computer–human interaction or human–computer interaction
CHI (conference)
CHI (compiler), an Intel C compiler for heterogeneous integration 
Hyperbolic cosine integral, in trigonometry

Transit
Chingford railway station, United Kingdom — railway station code
CHI, the IATA code for all Chicago airports
CHI, the Amtrak code for Chicago Union Station

Other
Chichester and Harbour Independents, a minor British political party (Chichester, England)
Columbia Helicopters, an American aircraft manufacturer
CHI, one of Longwood University § Secret societies (Virginia, USA)
Cationic Hydration Interlink, a hair-care brand owned by Farouk Systems (founded by Farouk Shami).

See also

Chi (disambiguation)
Chic (disambiguation)
Chik (disambiguation)